Xanthoparmelia chlorochroa, known as the tumbleweed shield lichen or ground lichen, is a foliose lichen in the Parmeliaceae family. It is not fixed to a substrate, and blows around in the wind from location to location.

Distribution and habitat

This lichen is abundant on the High Plains of Wyoming. Its distribution covers intermountain regions of western North America, and Mexico.

Uses
Tumbleweed shield lichen is used as a dye by Navajo rug weavers.

It has been used as a remedy for impetigo by the Navajo.

Toxicity
It was implicated in the poisoning of domestic sheep and cattle in Wyoming during the 1930s. It has also been implicated in the poisoning of elk in 2004.

See also
List of Xanthoparmelia species

References

chlorochroa
Lichens of North America
Lichens of Mexico
Lichens described in 1974
Lichen species
Taxa named by Edward Tuckerman